Jamie Quatro is an American fiction writer. Her debut story collection, I Want to Show You More, was published by Grove Press in 2013. Her first novel, Fire Sermon, was published in 2018.

I Want to Show You More was a New York Times Notable Book, NPR Best Book of 2013, Indie Next pick, O, The Oprah Magazine summer reading pick, and New York Times Editors’ Choice.

Quatro is a contributing editor for the magazine Oxford American. and teaches at Sewanee, The University of the South.

Bibliography

Books

Critical studies and reviews of Quatro's work
Fire sermon
 

I want to show you more

References

21st-century American novelists
Living people
Year of birth missing (living people)
American women novelists
21st-century American women writers
21st-century American short story writers
American women short story writers
MacDowell Colony fellows
College of William & Mary alumni
Bennington College alumni
Sewanee: The University of the South faculty